Lamporo (Lampeu in Piedmontese) is a comune (municipality) in the Province of Vercelli in the Italian region Piedmont, located about  northeast of Turin and about  southwest of Vercelli.

Lamporo borders the following municipalities: Crescentino, Livorno Ferraris, and Saluggia.

Demographic evolution

References

External links
 

Cities and towns in Piedmont